Sacred cow is an idiom, a figurative reference to cattle in religion and mythology. A sacred cow is a figure of speech for something considered immune from question or criticism, especially unreasonably so. This idiom is thought to originate in American English, although similar or even identical idioms occur in many other languages.

Background
The idiom is based on the popular understanding of the elevated place of cows in Hinduism and appears to have emerged in America in the late 19th century.  The reverence for cows in the traditionally agrarian Vedic Hindu society  stems from the reluctance to harm an animal whose milk humans consume after being weaned off the mother's milk.

In Jewish tradition, there is a similar moral stigma against cooking veal (calf meat) in cows milk.  A literal sacred cow or sacred bull is an actual cow or bull that is treated with sincere respect.

One writer has suggested that there is an element of paradox in the concept of respect for a sacred cow, as illustrated in a comment about the novelist V. S. Naipaul: "V. S. Naipaul ... has the ability to distinguish the death of an ordinary ox, which, being of concern to no one, may be put quickly out of its agony, from that of a sacred cow, which must be solicitously guarded so that it can die its agonizing death without any interference."

In popular culture
The motto of the satirical magazine The Realist was "Irreverence is our only sacred cow".

See also
Holy cow (expression)
Iconoclasm
Literal and figurative language
Malapropism

References

External links

19th-century neologisms
American English idioms
Hinduism and cattle